Robert Pintenat (1 May 1948  – 22 August 2008) was a French professional footballer who played as a striker. His clubs notably included Sochaux, Nancy and Toulouse. He won three caps for France.

He also had a career in management, including a spell as manager of the Gabon national football team.

He died in August 2008 following a long illness.

External links
 
 
 
 Photo
 Short bio

1948 births
2008 deaths
French footballers
France international footballers
FC Rouen players
Red Star F.C. players
Nîmes Olympique players
FC Sochaux-Montbéliard players
AS Nancy Lorraine players
Toulouse FC players
Ligue 1 players
Ligue 2 players
French football managers

Association football forwards
AC Avignonnais players
AC Avigonnnais managers